WETA (90.9 FM) is a non-commercial, public FM radio station licensed to serve Washington, D.C., broadcasting a classical music format.

WETA is a grandfathered “superpower” station. The station covers the Washington metropolitan area with the highest analog effective radiated power (ERP) of any FM station in the market with 75,000 watts. This exceeds the maximum analog ERP limit allowed for a Class B FM station, and is also above the maximum allowable analog ERP for the station's antenna height above average terrain (HAAT) according to current FCC rules, which is 32,000 watts at 186 meters.

WETA programming is simulcast on WGMS 89.1 in Hagerstown, Maryland and on translator W205BL 88.9 in Frederick, Maryland. WETA and WGMS broadcast using HD Radio.

Past formats and format changes
From 1970 through early 2005, WETA featured a mixed radio format of classical music, folk music, jazz, and news. It switched to a predominantly news and talk radio format from February 28, 2005 until January 22, 2007, when it switched to its current all-classical radio format. The switch was part of an unusual deal between the public radio station and commercial station WGMS (FM), which abandoned the classical music format it had aired for decades after an attempt to sell WGMS to Washington Commanders owner Dan Snyder failed. The FCC subsequently granted WETA permission to use the WGMS call letters for its Hagerstown, Maryland repeater station, formerly known as WETH.

Current format
WETA changed to a classical music format on January 22, 2007, at 8 p.m. EST, with classical music now offered for more of the broadcast day than ever before in the station's history. Its current classical format is primarily mainstream orchestral, with a smattering of early and baroque music and chamber music. Aside from Saturday afternoon opera, very few vocal performances are aired on WETA.

As of April 2007 WETA reduced the number of hourly NPR newscasts, which had continued to be heard every hour since the change to the classical music format. Newscasts are now heard on the hour during drive time and at selected hours at other times. WETA also airs audio from the PBS NewsHour Monday through Friday evenings, for the benefit of area commuters unable to arrive home in time to view the program on television.

WETA airs opera programming on Saturday afternoons, including the Metropolitan Opera radio broadcasts during the Met's regular December–April broadcast season. They inherited from WGMS an all-vocal classical music format branded, "VivaLaVoce, the station that sings", on HD2.

WETA's only competition in the market area is WBJC (91.5 FM), also a non-commercial station, which broadcasts a classical music format and is licensed to serve Baltimore, Maryland.

Other services
Since 1974, WETA has provided a subcarrier channel for the Metropolitan Washington Ear, a radio reading service for blind and visually impaired people. Listeners tune in to the service using special receivers provided free to qualifying individuals and can receive audio from more than 200 current publications, including newspapers, magazines, and books.

Stations
One full-power station is licensed to simulcast the programming of WETA:

Translators
WETA programming is broadcast on the following translator:

Signal note

WETA is short-spaced to WHYY-FM WHYY NPR (licensed to serve Philadelphia) as they operate on the same channel and the distance between the stations' transmitters is 128 miles as determined by FCC rules. The minimum distance between two Class B stations operating on the same channel according to current FCC rules is 150 miles.

References

External links

Classical WETA Live Stream
Classical WETA "Classical Blog for Music Lovers" by Critic-at-Large, Jens F. Laurson
The Segue from WGMS to WXGG
The Segue from News/NPR to Classical WETA
WETA FM Press Release describing January 22, 2007 format change to all classical

List of "grandfathered" Superpower FM radio stations in the U.S.

Classical music radio stations in the United States
ETA
Members of the Cultural Alliance of Greater Washington
NPR member stations
Radio stations established in 1970
1970 establishments in Virginia